Raduha is a mountain in the eastern part of Kamnik–Savinja Alps in northern Slovenia.

Geography
It is separated from its main group by the Savinja Gorge. It has relatively flat top in the northeast–southwest direction. Its lower peaks are Jelovec, Lanež, and Little Raduha (Mala Raduha), and the highest peak is Big Raduha (Velika Raduha). The Loka Lodge stands east of the summit. The highest-elevation show cave in Slovenia, Snow Cave, lies on the western side. The western and northern parts are rocky. It is the site of the Grohat mountain pasture with the Grohat Lodge.

Name
Raduha was attested in written sources in 1426 as Radoch. It is based on the hypocorism Radoh, derived from a Slavic personal name such as *Radoslavъ.

Starting points 
 Solčava
 Luče

Routes
 3h: from Rogovilc, over the southeastern ridge
 1½h: from the Loka Pasture, the southern course
 1½h: from the Loka Pasture, via the Durce Notch
 1½h: from the Grohat Pasture, via the Durce Notch
 1h: from the Grohat Pasture, via the northern plains

See also
Slovene Mountain Hiking Trail

References

 Slovenska planinska pot, Planinski vodnik, PZS, 2012, Milenko Arnejšek-Prle, Andraž Poljanec

External links

Routes, Description & Photos

Mountains of Styria (Slovenia)
Mountains of the Kamnik–Savinja Alps
Two-thousanders of Slovenia